MerXem Classic is an elite women's professional one-day road bicycle race held in Belgium; as of 2022 it is rated by the UCI as a 1.1 race.

The race was annulled in 2020 and 2021 due to COVID-19.

Past winners

References 

Cycle races in Belgium
Women's road bicycle races